Mohsin Peramban also known as  Mohsin P, Mohsin Valanchery& BikerKid (born 30 May 2002 in Athavanad Malappuram district Kerala, India. was an Indian professional motorcycle racer. National Motorcycle Racing 2021 in 2018,and in 2021 became the first Kerala winner of an National Motorcycle Racing event with his victory at the National Motorcycle Racing Championship 2021 in Chennai

Early life
Mohsin was born on 30 May 2002  in Rahat Nagar. Athavanad ( Near Valanchery) Malappuram district Kerala, India. The son of Mr Musthafa Peramban & Mrs Sakeena. 
He is a Plus Two Computer Science student in an MSM Higher secondary school Kallingalparambu 2021

Career
He is starting his career in the 2018 race at the Madras Motor Race Track in Chennai  Third place in the draw. 32 km in the laps on a 4 km long track he completes the distance in the best time Third, in MRF MMSC All India Motorcycle Championship from Chennai won the seat. One of the oldest Chennai clubs in India Muhsin won the all-India bike race at the Madras Sports Club Recognized. Muhsin was in the NNF category. Of the Honda NSF250R, he finished the race on a bike. There are only 10 people in India This bike is in use. Mohsin is one of them. The competitor is Honda Sponsored by‌. The only one from Kerala to receive such sponsorship Muhsin is a contestant

Achievements & awards 
Idemitsu Honda India Talent Cup Open NSF 250R  won the second race

References

External links

Living people
Sportspeople from Kerala
Long-distance motorcycle riders
2002 births
Indian motorsport people